Miss America's Outstanding Teen 2018 was the 12th Miss America's Outstanding Teen pageant held at the Linda Chapin Theatre in the Orange County Convention Center in Orlando, Florida on July 29, 2017, the same date as Miss Teen USA 2017. Nicole Jia of Oklahoma crowned her successor Jessica Baeder of Alabama at the end of the event. This was the first time that Miss Alabama's Outstanding Teen captured the title of Miss America's Outstanding Teen.

As of 2023, it is the first and only edition of Miss America's Outstanding Teen to have two contestants who would later go on to capture the title of Miss America; Emma Broyles of Alaska and Grace Stanke of Wisconsin, who won Miss America 2022 & 2023 respectively.

Overview

Judges 
The panel of judges on the final night of competition included TV anchor, veterinarian, and Miss America 1990, Debbye Turner Bell; beauty business executive, Sinead Norenius-Raniere, sociologist and professor, Hilary Levey Friedman; American tenor, Benjamin Brecher; pediatrician, Jamie Wells; and co-founder of Dance Network, Julie Stadler.

Results

Placements

§ America's Choice

Order of announcements

Top 12

Top 9

Top 5

Awards

Preliminary awards

Talent awards

Other awards

Contestants
The Miss America's Outstanding Teen 2018 contestants are:

References

2018
2018 beauty pageants
2018 in Florida